is a private university in Kirishima, Kagoshima, Japan. The predecessor of the school was founded in 1907, and it was chartered as a women's university in 1979. In 1999, it became a co-ed institution and adopted the present name.

External links
 Official website 

Educational institutions established in 1907
Private universities and colleges in Japan
Universities and colleges in Kagoshima Prefecture
1907 establishments in Japan